All Saints Catholic School was a Catholic secondary school located on Layhams Road, West Wickham, London Borough of Bromley. Formerly known as 'St. John Rigby Catholic College', its name was changed in 2004 as a rebranding because of falling pupil numbers and substantial debts following the departure of former headmistress Colleen McCabe.

The site was originally a teacher training college before opening as a school in 1979. It was an amalgamation of the former St Joseph's School for Boys, Orpington, itself a former Victorian orphanage, now a housing estate opposite Orpington Hospital and a girls' school.

Mr. Tranter was the first Deputy Headmaster.

The site is now being developed for housing .

Fraud and closure
Colleen McCabe was convicted in 2003 of stealing around £500,000 from her school over a period from 1994 to 1999, which she spent lavishly both on herself and on gifts for her friends. The story was the subject of the 2006 BBC docudrama, The Thieving Headmistress Money was diverted away from the school's budget resulting in the children being without books in a dirty, unheated school. The fraud was only detected when the school's grant maintained status was reverted and control was returned to the local education authority. McCabe was sentenced to five years in prison.

After a consultation period, in April 2006 Bromley Council approved the proposal to close the school with effect from August 2007.

Notable former pupils

 Skream, DJ and producer
 Jason Puncheon, professional footballer
 Liam Fontaine, professional footballer
 Michael Carberry, cricketer
 James Dasaolu, athlete, 100m & 4 × 100 m
  Craig (Spider) Richards, professional boxer

References 

 School closure - Bromley Council
 Headteacher's legacy jeopardising school - News Shopper
 Head 'spent £7,000 on shoes' - BBC News

External links 
 Official site

Defunct Catholic schools in the Archdiocese of Southwark
Defunct schools in the London Borough of Bromley
Educational institutions disestablished in 2007
2007 disestablishments in England